Irton is a village and civil parish in the Scarborough district of North Yorkshire, England. According to the 2011 UK census, Irton parish had a population of 312, a decrease on the 2001 UK census figure of 332.

References

External links

Villages in North Yorkshire
Civil parishes in North Yorkshire
Borough of Scarborough